The Office of Intelligence and Analysis may refer to:
DHS Office of Intelligence and Analysis - an office of the United States Department of Homeland Security 
Office of Intelligence and Analysis (Treasury Department) - an office of the United States Department of the Treasury